The 1926 King's Birthday Honours in New Zealand, celebrating the official birthday of King George V, were appointments made by the King on the recommendation of the New Zealand government to various orders and honours to reward and highlight good works by New Zealanders. They were announced on 3 July 1926.

The recipients of honours are displayed here as they were styled before their new honour.

Knight Bachelor
 Charles Holdsworth – managing director of the Union Steamship Company of New Zealand Limited. In recognition of his services in the development of New Zealand.
 The Honourable Charles Ernest Statham – speaker of the House of Representatives.

Order of the Bath

Companion (CB)
Military division
 Captain (Commodore 2nd class) Alister Francis Beal  – commodore commanding the New Zealand Division of the Royal Navy, and naval advisor to the New Zealand government.

Order of Saint Michael and Saint George

Companion (CMG)
 John Sutherland Ross – of Dunedin; chairman of directors of the New Zealand and South Seas International Exhibition.
 Harold Livingstone Tapley  – mayor of the City of Dunedin, and a director of the New Zealand and South Seas International Exhibition.

Order of the British Empire

Dame Grand Cross (GBE)
 Christina Allen Massey  – of Wellington. For services to New Zealand.

Commander (CBE)
Civil division
 Samuel Hurst Seager  – of Christchurch; a prominent architect.
 Charles Speight – of Dunedin; vice-chairman of the New Zealand and South Seas International Exhibition.

Companion of the Imperial Service Order (ISO)
 Robert Edward Hayes – of Wellington; secretary to the Treasury.

References

Birthday Honours
1926 awards
1926 in New Zealand
New Zealand awards